John Francis Burns (November 15, 1933 – January 27, 2020) was an American comedian, actor, voice actor, writer, and producer. During the 1960s, he was part of two comedy partnerships, first with George Carlin and later with Avery Schreiber. He is perhaps best known for his short stint as "Warren," Barney Fife's deputy replacement on "The Andy Griffith Show" in 1965. By the 1970s, he had transitioned to working behind the camera as a writer and producer on such comedy series as The Muppet Show and Hee Haw.

Biography
Burns enlisted in the United States Marine Corps in 1952. It wasn't long before Burns realized a military life was not for him: "the first week of boot camp changed my mind." He served in Korea, rose to the rank of sergeant, and was discharged around 1954.

Burns began his comedy career in 1959, when he partnered with George Carlin; both were working for radio station KXOL in Fort Worth, Texas. After successful performances at a Fort Worth beat coffeehouse, The Cellar, Burns and Carlin headed for California in February 1960 and continued to work together for two more years. An album containing some of their material was released in 1963, titled Burns and Carlin at the Playboy Club Tonight.

Longer lasting was a later teaming with Avery Schreiber, whom he met when they were both members of The Second City, a live comedy and improv troupe based in Chicago. Burns and Schreiber were best known for a series of routines in which Burns played a talkative taxicab passenger, with Schreiber as the driver. During the summer of 1973, the two appeared on the ABC TV variety series The Burns and Schreiber Comedy Hour.

During the first half of the 1965–1966 season of The Andy Griffith Show, in an attempt to replace Don Knotts' Barney Fife character after Knotts left the show, Burns was cast as Warren Ferguson, a dedicated but inept deputy sheriff. His character was not popular, and was dropped after 11 appearances.

In 1967, he was cast as "Candy Butcher" in The Night They Raided Minsky's. In 1971, he was cast as Mr. Kelly in The Partridge Family episode "Dora, Dora, Dora,” (S2/Ep1). Hanna-Barbera gave the voice of Harry Boyle's reactionary neighbor, Ralph Kane, to Burns in the short-lived syndicated prime-time cartoon Wait Till Your Father Gets Home. The series was a forerunner of adult animation comedies. Burns was the headwriter for the first season of Hee Haw and The Muppet Show. Schreiber appeared on an episode with The Muppet Show during that first season. Burns also co-wrote The Muppet Movie (with Jerry Juhl, his successor as head writer of The Muppet Show). He hosted a 1977 episode of NBC's Saturday Night Live.

In the early 1980s, Burns became a writer, announcer and occasional performer on the ABC sketch comedy series Fridays. He and comedian Michael Richards were involved in a staged on-air fight with Andy Kaufman, later re-created in the Kaufman biopic Man on the Moon (with Kaufman's longtime friend Bob Zmuda portraying Burns.)

Burns teamed with Lorenzo Music to provide the voices for a pair of crash test dummies named Vince and Larry, respectively, in a series of United States Department of Transportation public service announcements that promoted the use of seat belts. Distributed by the Ad Council, the advertising campaign ran from 1985 to 1998. In 1993, he starred in the animated series Animaniacs, as the voice of Sid the Squid, giving the character a raspy, Daffy Duck kind of voice. Schreiber also appeared on the show as the voice of Beanie the Brain-Dead Bison. Burns was a guest voice in a 1999 episode of The Simpsons called "Beyond Blunderdome.”

Burns died from respiratory failure on January 27, 2020, at age 86, in Los Angeles, California.

References

External links

The Revenge of Warren Ferguson on the Andy Griffith Show
Part One of a two-part Jack Burns Biography
 
 

1933 births
2020 deaths
20th-century American comedians
20th-century American male actors
21st-century American comedians
21st-century American male actors
American male comedians
American male screenwriters
American male television actors
American male television writers
American male voice actors
American television writers
Burials at Los Angeles National Cemetery
Deaths from respiratory failure
Male actors from Boston
Screenwriters from Massachusetts
United States Marine Corps personnel of the Korean War
United States Marines